Gordon Leslie Simpson (3 June 1929 – 10 May 2017) was an Australian politician.

Simpson was the National Party member for Cooroora from 1974 to 1989 and served as Minister for Mines and Energy and Minister for the Arts from 25 November to 1 December 1987. His daughter, Fiona Simpson, is also a National Party politician. He died in Nambour, Australia on 10 May 2017, aged 87.

References

1929 births
2017 deaths
National Party of Australia members of the Parliament of Queensland
Members of the Queensland Legislative Assembly